Jung Ha-na (born February 2, 1990), better known by her former stage name Zinger and mononymously as Hana, is a former South Korean singer and television personality. She is best known for being a member of the South Korean girl group Secret.

Early life
Jung Hana was born in Uijeongbu, Gyeonggi, South Korea on February 2, 1990. Her mother worked as a singer in the 1980s and her father worked as a bodyguard.

Career

2009–present: Secret and rising popularity

In September 2009, TS Entertainment announced that they will be debuting a four-member girl group in October 2009. Hana debuted with the stage name of Zinger, along with Han Sunhwa, Song Jieun and Jun Hyoseong, as the group, Secret. Prior to their debut, the group was on a documentary show called "Secret Story" which chronicled their debut process. They released their debut single "I Want You Back" in October 2009.

In April 2010, Secret released their first mini-album titled Secret Time which spawned them the hit single "Magic" and served as their breakthrough song in South Korea. In August 2010, they released their second mini-album titled "Madonna" and the title track continued their success as it topped the Gaon Single Charts.

In January 2011, the group deviated from their "sexy" and "sassy" image and released "Shy Boy", a "cutesy" and retro-inspired song. Although they were worried with the 180-degree image transformation, the single exceeded their expectations as the song was a major success. "Shy Boy" charted strongly in digital charts and Secret won their first trophy on music shows with the song. They won a total of five trophies in various music shows with "Shy Boy". Secret continued their success with the release of their second CD single titled "Starlight Moonlight". The title track became another hit for Secret as the song reached number one on the Gaon Monthly Singles Charts and won them another trophy in SBS's Inkigayo.

The same year, Secret began a foray of Japanese activities with the release of "Madonna" and Shy Boy (EP). The Japanese remake of "Madonna" debuted at number nine in the Oricon singles charts. Secret was one of the first three Korean girl groups to debut on the Oricon chart in the top 10, the others being Kara and Girls Generation being the first and second respectively. In October 2011, they released their first studio album titled Moving in Secret, which spawned them another hit with the lead single "Love is Move". Hana also participated in the production of Moving in Secret by writing most of the rap parts in their songs and the album featured a solo track for Hana titled "Amazinger". Secret released their first mini-album in Japan titled Shy Boy (EP). The mini-album debuted also at number nine on the Oricon album charts.

In February 2012, Secret released their second CD single in Japan titled "So Much For Goodbye".

Starting from promotions for Secret's single "YooHoo" from their album Letter from Secret released April 30, 2013, Hana began officially promoting under her real name, Jung Hana.

Personal life
Hana is an only child. Her mother was a singer who had passed the TBS Talent Exam and released a single in South Korea. Her father is a martial artist and was a presidential bodyguard. She is also friends with 2NE1's CL and Wonder Girls' Sunye while attending the same dance academy in middle school.

On 11 December 2012, at 2am, Hana was involved in a car accident with the other Secret members, breaking her ribs and bruising one of her lungs. A van that had been carrying her and the other members slipped off the road and turned over on itself. The incident was followed by harsh Tweets directed at Hana. Hana tweeted on the 13th,

The girls decided to rest until 28 December, despite releasing their newest single, "Talk That" on the 4th.

Discography

Soundtrack appearances and solo performances

Filmography

Television dramas

Variety shows

Music shows

References

External links

 Official Japanese website
 Official Korean website

Secret (South Korean band) members
TS Entertainment artists
People from Uijeongbu
Living people
South Korean female idols
K-pop singers
South Korean women pop singers
South Korean television personalities
1990 births